Vaudreuil is a provincial electoral district in the Montérégie region of Quebec, Canada that elects members to the National Assembly of Quebec. The biggest municipality in the district is Vaudreuil-Dorion.

It was created for the 1867 election (and an electoral district of that name existed earlier in the Legislative Assembly of the Province of Canada and the Legislative Assembly of Lower Canada).  Its final election was in 1936.  It disappeared in the 1939 election and its successor electoral district was Vaudreuil-Soulanges.

It was re-created for the 1989 election from the eastern part of Vaudreuil-Soulanges electoral district.

In the change from the 2001 to the 2011 electoral map, its territory was unchanged.

It was named after former governor of New France from 1703 to 1725, Philippe de Rigaud de Vaudreuil.

Members of the Legislative Assembly / National Assembly

Election results

* Result compared to Action démocratique

References

External links
Information
 Elections Quebec

Election results
 Election results (National Assembly)
 Election results (QuébecPolitique)
 Election results(Chief Electoral Officer)

Maps
 2011 map (PDF)
 2001 map (Flash)
2001–2011 changes (Flash)
1992–2001 changes (Flash)
 Electoral map of Montérégie region
 Quebec electoral map, 2011

1988 establishments in Quebec
Quebec provincial electoral districts
Vaudreuil-Dorion